Jackson Hill is a mountain located in the Catskill Mountains of New York southwest of North Franklin. The peak of Jackson Hill is called Waterman Peak. Oak Hill is located southwest, Chamberlain Hill is located west-northwest, and Coe Hill is located northeast of Jackson Hill.

References

Mountains of Delaware County, New York
Mountains of New York (state)